Narita Airport Terminal 1 (Narita Airport) Station is an underground airport rail link station located beneath Terminal 1 of Narita International Airport in Narita, Chiba, Japan. The station is shared between East Japan Railway Company (JR East) and the private railway operator Keisei Electric Railway.

Station layout
The JR East portion of the station has one island platform. The Keisei portion of the station has two island platforms: one serves one track (No. 1) and the other serves two. Each of the two tracks of the latter has two positions for trains, which are separately numbered (one is numbered 2 and 4, and the other is 3 and 5). On 17 July 2010, the Keisei Line platforms and concourses were segregated: one portion is for Narita Sky Access Line trains (including Skyliner) and the other portion for Keisei Main Line trains. Passengers not using the Narita Sky Access Line must pass through a second ticket barrier prior to entering the platforms. The purpose for this is to enforce the separate fare structure that will be in place for Narita Sky Access trains.

JR East

The station has a Midori no Madoguchi staffed ticket office.

Keisei Electric Railway

History
Originally built for the planned Narita Shinkansen, the station opened on 19 March 1991. Before this, there was also a station named Narita Airport Station, which was served only by Keisei and connected with the airport terminal by bus. The former station was renamed Higashi-Narita Station on the same day the present airport station was opened.　

On 17 July 2010, the same day that Skyliner limited express services began operations on the Narita Sky Access Line, the layout of Keisei Line platforms and concourses was changed. For details, see "Station layout" section above. The station also received a station number for Keisei services on that date; Narita Airport Terminal 1 Station was assigned station number KS42.

See also
 List of railway stations in Japan

References

External links

 JR East: Narita Airport Terminal 1 Station information 
 JR East: Narita Airport Terminal 1 Station guide map 
 Keisei: Narita Airport Terminal 1 Station map

Railway stations in Chiba Prefecture
Railway stations in Narita, Chiba
Airport railway stations in Japan
Narita International Airport
Railway stations in Japan opened in 1991